Tanta is a town in the Minya Governorate of Egypt. It is located near Mallawi.

Notable people from Tanta
Saint Dasya

Populated places in Minya Governorate